Nemophora humilis is a species of moth of the Adelidae family that is known from Mozambique.

References

Endemic fauna of Mozambique
Adelidae
Moths described in 1891
Moths of Africa
Lepidoptera of Mozambique